Cyrus S. Poonawalla (born in 1941) is an Indian billionaire businessman, and the chairman and managing director of the Cyrus Poonawalla Group, which includes the Serum Institute of India, an Indian biotech company which is the largest vaccine manufacturer in the world and  Poonawalla Fincorp a leading NBFC in India. In 2022, he is ranked number 4 on Forbes India rich list with a net worth of $24.3 billion. He is ranked number 1 in Hurun Global health care rich list 2022.

Career 
Poonawalla founded the Serum Institute of India in 1966 and built it to the largest vaccine manufacturer (by doses) in the world. Serum produces over 1.5 billion doses annually of a range of vaccines, including for measles, polio and flu.

Family
Cyrus Poonawalla was born in a Parsi family he is the son of Soli Poonawala, who was a horse breeder. He was married to Villoo Poonawalla, who died in 2010. They have a son, Adar, who currently works as the CEO of Serum Institute of India.

Awards
 Padma Shri for his contribution to the field of medicine, by the Government of India in 2005.
 The Ernst & Young "Entrepreneur of the Year" in the category of Healthcare & Life Sciences in November 2007.
 The Ernst & Young Entrepreneur of the Year for India in February 2015.
 Honorary doctorate by the University of Massachusetts Medical School in June 2018.
 Honorary doctorate by the University of Oxford in June 2019.
‘ICMR Lifetime Achievement Medal’ for contribution in healthcare by Bill Gates in November 2019.
Lokmanya Tilak National Award in August 2021.
Dean’s medal from the Johns Hopkins Bloomberg School of Public Health in May 2022.
Padma Bhushan, for his contribution in production of vaccines during COVID-19,in the field of Trade and Industry, by the Government of India in 2022.

Philanthropy
In May 2019, it was reported that Poonawalla, in partnership with Naum Koen, had proposed supplying Ukraine with 100 thousand doses of the measles vaccine for free vaccination.

References

Businesspeople from Pune
Indian billionaires
Indian chief executives
Indian businesspeople in the pharmaceutical industry
Recipients of the Padma Shri in medicine
Living people
Savitribai Phule Pune University alumni
20th-century Indian businesspeople
1941 births
21st-century Indian businesspeople
Recipients of the Padma Bhushan in trade and industry
Parsi people